The Labor Caucus of the United States House of Representatives was founded in November 2020 with the aim of expanding labor union power in the United States. The caucus supports measures such as the Protecting the Right to Organize Act that would expand union participation and make forming unions easier.

Membership

117th Congress

Co-Chairs
 Rep. Mark Pocan (WI-2)
 Rep. Donald Norcross (NJ-1)
 Rep. Thomas Suozzi (NY-3)
 Rep. Linda Sánchez (CA-38)
 Rep. Debbie Dingell (MI-12)
 Rep. Steven Horsford (NV-4)

Members

 Rep. Alma Adams (NC-12)
 Rep. Colin Allred (TX-32)
 Rep. Don Beyer (VA-8)
 Rep. Earl Blumenauer (OR-3)
 Rep. Suzanne Bonamici (OR-1)
 Rep. Jamaal Bowman (NY-16)
 Rep. Anthony Brown (MD-4)
 Rep. Julia Brownley (CA-26)
 Rep. Cheri Bustos (IL-17)
 Rep. Salud Carbajal (CA-24)
 Rep. Tony Cárdenas (CA-29)
 Rep. Andre Carson (IN-7)
 Rep. Matt Cartwright (PA-8)
 Rep. Kathy Castor (FL-14)
 Rep. Judy Chu (CA-27)
 Rep. David Cicilline (RI-1)
 Rep. Katherine Clark (MA-5)
 Rep. Yvette Clarke (NY-9)
 Rep. Emanuel Cleaver (MO-5)
 Rep. Joe Courtney (CT-2)
 Rep. Jason Crow (CO-6)
 Rep. Sharice Davids (KS-3)
 Rep. Madeleine Dean (PA-4)
 Rep. Rosa DeLauro (CT-3)
 Rep. Antonio Delgado (NY-19)
 Rep. Mark DeSaulnier (CA-11)
 Rep. Lloyd Doggett (TX-35)
 Rep. Mike Doyle (PA-18)
 Rep. Veronica Escobar (TX-16)
 Rep. Adriano Espaillat (NY-13)
 Rep. Lois Frankel (FL-21)
 Rep. Ruben Gallego (AZ-7)
 Rep. John Garamendi (CA-3)
 Rep. Jesús "Chuy" García (IL-4)
 Rep. Jimmy Gomez (CA-34)
 Rep. Josh Gottheimer (NJ-5)
 Rep. Al Green (TX-9)
 Rep. Raúl Grijalva (AZ-3)
 Rep. Jahana Hayes (CT-5)
 Rep. Brian Higgins (NY-26)
 Rep. Jared Huffman (CA-2)
 Rep. Sheila Jackson Lee (TX-18)
 Rep. Pramila Jayapal (WA-7) 
 Rep. Hank Johnson (GA-4)
 Rep. Mondaire Jones (NY-17)
 Rep. Marcy Kaptur (OH-9)
 Rep. Ro Khanna (CA-17)
 Rep. Dan Kildee (MI-5)
 Rep. Derek Kilmer (WA-6)
 Rep. Andy Kim (NJ-3)
 Rep. Ann Kirkpatrick (AZ-2)
 Rep. Conor Lamb (PA-17)
 Rep. John B. Larson (CT-1)
 Rep. Brenda L. Lawrence (MI-14)
 Rep. Barbara Lee (CA-13)
 Rep. Teresa Leger Fernandez (NM-3)
 Rep. Andy Levin (MI-9)
 Rep. Mike Levin (CA-49)
 Rep. Ted Lieu (CA-33)
 Rep. Alan Lowenthal (CA-47)
 Rep. Elaine Luria (VA-2)
 Rep. Stephen Lynch (MA-8)
 Rep. Tom Malinowski (NJ-7)
 Rep. Carolyn Maloney (NY-12)
 Rep. Kathy Manning (NC-6)
 Rep. Betty McCollum (MN-4)
 Rep. Jim McGovern (MA-2)
 Rep. Grace Meng (NY-6)
 Rep. Gwen Moore (WI-4)
 Rep. Joseph Morelle (NY-25)
 Rep. Frank Mrvan (IN-1)
 Rep. Joe Neguse (CO-2)
 Rep. Marie Newman (IL-3)
 Del. Eleanor Holmes Norton (DC-at large)
 Rep. Ilhan Omar (MN-5)
 Rep. Frank Pallone (NJ-6)
 Rep. Jimmy Panetta (CA-20)
 Rep. Bill Pascrell (NJ-9)
 Rep. Donald Payne Jr. (NJ-10)
 Rep. Ed Perlmutter (CO-7)
 Rep. Katie Porter (CA-45)
 Rep. Jamie Raskin (MD-8)
 Rep. Lisa Blunt Rochester (DE-at large)
 Rep. Lucille Roybal-Allard (CA-40)
 Rep. Tim Ryan (OH-13)
 Rep. Mary Gay Scanlon (PA-5)
 Rep. Jan Schakowsky (IL-9)
 Rep. Adam Schiff (CA-28)
 Rep. Brad Schneider (IL-10)
 Rep. Bobby Scott (VA-3)
 Rep. Mikie Sherrill (NJ-11)
 Rep. Albio Sires (NJ-8)
 Rep. Adam Smith (WA-9)
 Rep. Darren Soto (FL-9)
 Rep. Haley Stevens (MI-11)
 Rep. Eric Swalwell (CA-15)
 Rep. Mark Takano (CA-41)
 Rep. Dina Titus (NV-1)
 Rep. Rashida Tlaib (MI-13)
 Rep. Paul Tonko (NY-20)
 Rep. Ritchie Torres (NY-15)
 Rep. Lori Trahan (MA-3)
 Rep. David Trone (MD-6)
 Rep. Nydia Velázquez (NY-7)
 Rep. Bonnie Watson Coleman (NJ-12)
 Rep. Peter Welch (VT-at large)
 Rep. Susan Wild (PA-7)
 Rep. Nikema Williams (GA-5)
 Rep. Frederica Wilson (FL-24)

Former members

See also
Congressional Progressive Caucus
Blue Collar Caucus

References

External links
 

Democratic Party (United States) organizations
Organizations established in 2020
Factions in the Democratic Party (United States)
Ideological caucuses of the United States Congress
Labour parties